Lestiani Andryani better known with the mononym Lesti (born 5 August 1999) is an Indonesian singer, actress, and television personality of Sundanese origin. In her earliest releases, she is known as Lesti DA (meaning Lesti Dangdut Academy) or Lesti Kejora (based on her first similarly titled hit "Kejora").

Although she sings in various genres, she primarily sings Dangdut music, a genre of Indonesian folk that is partly derived and fused from Hindustani, Arabic music and Malay and local folk music. Lesti has been instrumental in popularizing Dangdut throughout music fandom in Indonesia, Malaysia, Singapore and Brunei Darussalam. She is signed to Trinity Optima Production. She has also acted in a number of film productions. After various appearances without any Islamic attire, she decided to wear a hijab in the later part of her career. Her collaborations with other artists have earned her accolades and awards, particularly her work with Fildan Rahayu, Rizky Billar and Danang in duets. Her collaboration with notable songwriters such as Nur Bayan and Pak Ngah resulted in massive hits for her.

Lesti started singing at a very young age. By age 8, she had stage experience singing in public at various venues. At age 14, she auditioned for the regionals of D'Academy (Dangdut Academy) on the Indosiar television network. Her audition in Cianjur earned her a golden ticket qualifying her directly to the Jakarta main pan-Indonesian show. She won the title in the first season of Indonesia's D'Academy talent competition in 2014 due to her distinctive and powerful voice. Immediately after, Lesti released her debut single "Kejora", which was created by Nur Bayan and was her winning song from the show. She also won a monetary prize and a car. At the end of 2015 she took part in D'Academy Asia, finishing runner-up to the winner Danang Pradana Dieva.

Lesti has received top awards in the Indonesian dangdut music industry and countless nominations, including at the Ahugerah Music Indonesia (AMI) Awards 2017 where she won the "Best Dangdut Male / Female Solo Artist" category for the song "Egois". She won it again in 2020 for her song "Tirani". She is continuing her education at Mercu Buana University since 2018.

In 2020, Lesti sat as a juror during the Liga Dangdut Indonesia talent competition on the Indosiar television channel. She has also appeared on a number of television mini-series.

Lesti dated Rizki Syafaruddin, a fellow-contestant known as Rizki D'Academy, but the couple broke up and Rizki went on to marry Nadya Mustika Rahayu in July 2020.

Personal life 
Lesti is engaged to actor Rizky Billar on 13 June 2021 at Gedong Putih, Lembang, Bandung. The application program that carries the Sundanese tradition is broadcast live on Indosiar. 

Lesti married actor Rizky Billar after holding the marriage contract and consent on 19 August 2021 at 10.30 WIB at the Intercontinental Hotel Pondok Indah, South Jakarta. On 26 December 2021, they became parents to a baby boy whom they named Muhammad Leslar Al-Fatih Billar.

Discography

Singles
2014: "Kejora"
2015: "Zapin Melayu"
2017: "Egois"
2017: "Buka Mata Hati"
2018: "Mati Gaya"
2018: "Purnama"
2018: "Lebih Dari Selamanya" (feat. Fildan Rahayu)
2019: "Ada Cerita"
2020: "Tirani"
2020: "Ku Lepas Dengan Ikhlas" 
2021: "Bismillah Cinta" (feat Ungu)
2021: "Bawa Aku ke Penghulu"
2022: "Lentera"

Television
2020: Liga Dangdut Indonesia on Indosiar – Judge
2020: Beraksi Di Rumah Saja on Indosiar – Host / Presenter
2020: Tasbih on Indosiar – Presenter
2021-2022: ''D'Academy' on Indosiar - Judge

Awards and nominations

References

Indonesian actresses
21st-century Indonesian women singers
1999 births
Living people
People from Bandung